Canadian Car of the Year winners, as chosen by the Automobile Journalists Association of Canada:

Canadian Car of the Year

2014
Canadian car of the year: Mazda 6
Canadian Utility vehicle of the year: Jeep Cherokee
Best New Small Car (under $21,000): Mazda 3
Best New Small Car (over $21,000): Mazda 3 Sport
Best New Family Car (under $30,000): Kia Soul
Best New Family Car (over $30,000): Mazda 6
Best New Luxury Car (under $50,000): Lexus IS 350 RWD
Best New Luxury Car (over $50,000): Infiniti Q50 Hybrid
Best New Prestige Car: Mercedes-Benz S Class
Best New Sports / Performance Car (over $50,000):Chevrolet Corvette Stingray
Best New SUV / CUV (under $35,000): Jeep Cherokee
Best New SUV / CUV ($35,000 - $60,000):Kia Sorento
Best New SUV / CUV (over $60,000):Acura MDX
Best New Pickup: GMC Sierra
Best New Technology: Innovation :Infiniti: Direct Adaptive Steering
Best New Technology: Safety: Infiniti: Predictive Forward Collision Warning

2013
Car of the year: Honda Accord Sedan
Utility Vehicle of the year: Hyundai Santa Fe Sport 2.0T
Best New City Car: Ford Focus EV
Best New Small Car (under $21,000): Mazda 3 Skyactiv Sedan
Best New Small Car (over $21,000): Hyundai Elantra GT
Best New Family Car (under $30,000): Honda Accord Sedan
Best New Family Car (over $30,000): Ford Fusion Hybrid
Best New Luxury Car: Cadillac ATS
Best New Prestige / Performance Car: Porsche 911 Carrera S
Best New Sports / Performance Car (under $50,000): Ford Focus ST
Best New Sports / Performance Car (over $50,000): Porsche Boxster
Best New SUV / CUV (under $35,000): Ford Escape 1.6L EcoBoost
Best New SUV / CUV ($35,000 - $60,000): Hyundai Santa Fe Sport 2.0T
Best New Technology: General Motors: Front Centre Airbag
Best New Design: Porsche 911 Carrera S

2012 	
 Car of the year:Hyundai Elantra
 Utility Vehicle of the year: Volkswagen Touareg TDI Clean Diesel
Best New Small Car (under $21,000): Hyundai Accent
Best New Small Car (over $21,000): Hyundai Elantra
Best New Family Car (under $30,000): Kia Optima LX
Best New Family Car (over $30,000): Kia Optima Hybrid
Best New Luxury Car:Mercedes-Benz C-Class C350 4MATIC Sedan
Best New Prestige Car: Mercedes-Benz S-Class S350 BlueTEC 4MATIC
Best New Sports / Performance Car (under $50,000):Hyundai Veloster
Best New Sports / Performance Car (over $50,000):BMW 1 Series M Coupé
Best New SUV / CUV (under $35,000):Dodge Journey
Best New SUV / CUV ($35,000 - $60,000):Volkswagen Touareg TDI Clean Diesel
Best New SUV / CUV (over $60,000):BMW X3
Best New Technology: General Motors: Voltec Propulsion System
Best New Design: Hyundai Veloster

2011
 Best New Small Car (under $21,000) - Ford Fiesta
 Best New Small Car (over $21,000) - Chevrolet Cruze
 Best New Family Car (under $30,000) - Volkswagen Jetta TDI Clean Diesel
 Best New Family Car (over $30,000) - Buick Regal
 Best New Luxury Car (over $50,000) - BMW 5 Series Sedan
 Best New Prestige Car - Porsche 911 Turbo S
 Best New Sports / Performance Car (over $50,000) - Cadillac CTS-V Coupe
 Best New Minivan - Toyota Sienna
 Best New SUV / CUV (under $35,000) - Hyundai Tucson
 Best New SUV / CUV ($35,000 - $50,000) - Ford Edge
 Best New SUV / CUV (over $50,000) - Volkswagen Touareg
 Best New Technology - Ford's Rear Inflatable Seat Belts
 Best New Design - Mercedes-Benz SLS AMG

2010
 Best New Small Car (under $21,000) - Mazda3
 Best New Small Car (over $21,000) - Mazda3 Sport
 Best New Family Car (under $30,000) - Volkswagen Golf Wagon TDI
 Best New Family Car (over $30,000) - Ford Taurus
 Best New Luxury Car (over $50,000) - BMW 335d Sedan
 Best New Prestige Car - Porsche Panamera
 Best New Sports / Performance Car (under $50,000) - Volkswagen Golf GTI
 Best New Sports / Performance Car (over $50,000) - Audi S4
 Best New Convertible - Audi S5 Cabriolet
 Best New SUV / CUV (under $35,000) - Subaru Outback
 Best New SUV / CUV ($35,000 - $60,000) - Volkswagen Touareg TDI Clean Diesel
 Best New SUV / CUV (over $60,000) - Lexus RX450h

2009
 Best New Small Car (under $18,000) - Toyota Corolla
 Best New Small Car (over $18,000) - Pontiac Vibe
 Best New Family Car ($22,000-$30,000) - Mazda6
 Best New Family Car (over $30,000) - Volkswagen Passat CC
 Best New Luxury Car (under $50,000) - Hyundai Genesis
 Best New Luxury Car (over $50,000) - Audi A4
 Best New Prestige Car - Mercedes CL 550 and Mercedes SL 63 AMG (tie)
 Best New Sports / Performance Car (under $50,000) - BMW 135i Coupe
 Best New Sports / Performance Car (over $50,000) - Lexus IS F
 Best New Convertible - Audi TTS
 Best New SUV / CUV (under $35,000) - Subaru Forester
 Best New SUV / CUV ($35,000 - $60,000) - Ford Flex
 Best New SUV / CUV (over $60,000) - Mercedes-Benz M-Class BlueTEC
 Best New Pick-up Truck - Dodge Ram

2008
 Best New Small Car - Saturn Astra
 Best New Family Car - Honda Accord EX Sedan
 Best New Luxury Car - Mercedes-Benz C Class
 Best New Prestige Car - Audi R8
 Best New Sports / Performance Car (under $50,000) - MINI Cooper S
 Best New Sports / Performance Car (over $50,000) - Audi S5
 Best New Convertible - BMW 335i Cabriolet
 Best New Minivan - Hyundai Entourage
 Best New SUV / CUV (under $35,000) - Nissan Rogue
 Best New SUV / CUV ($35,000 - $60,000) - Saturn Vue
 Best New SUV / CUV (over $60,000) - Buick Enclave
 Best New Pick-up Truck - Chevrolet Silverado
 Best New Technology - Ford Sync
 Best New Design - Audi R8

2007
 Best Small Car (under $18k) – Honda Fit LX
 Best Small Car (over $18k) – Volkswagen Rabbit 2.5
 Best New Family Car ($22k -$30k) – Toyota Camry LE
 Best New Family Car (over $30k) – Toyota Camry Hybrid
 Best Luxury Car (under $50k) – Lexus ES350
 Best Prestige Car (over $75k) – Audi S8
 Best Sports/Performance Car (under $50k) – Mazdaspeed3
 Best Sports/Performance Car (over $50k) – BMW 3 Series Coupé
 Best Convertible Car – Volkswagen EOS 2.0T
 Best SUV/CUV (under $35k) – Toyota RAV4 - V6 Sport
 Best SUV/CUV ($35k-$60k) – Acura RDX Technology Package
 Best SUV/CUV (over $60k) – Mercedes-Benz GL-Class (X164)
 Best Pick-up – Chevrolet Avalanche

2006
 Best New Economy Car – Honda Civic Sedan
 Best New Family Car (under $35,000) – Hyundai Sonata GLS
 Best New Family Car (over $35,000) – Hyundai Azera
 Best New Luxury / Prestige Car – BMW 5 Series Touring
 Best New Sports Sedan – BMW 3 Series
 Best New Sport Car – Honda Civic Si Coupe
 Best New Sport Utility Vehicle – Mercedes-Benz M-Class
 Best New Pick-up – Honda Ridgeline
 Best New Multipurpose Family Vehicle – Mazda Mazda5
 Best New Modern Muscle Car – Dodge Magnum SRT-8
 Most Coveted Vehicle – Chevrolet Corvette C6 Z06

2005
 Best New Economy Car – Kia Spectra Sedan
 Best New Family Car – Mazda Mazda6 Sport
 Best New Luxury Car – Chrysler 300C
 Best New Sport Utility Vehicle – BMW X3 3.0i
 Best New Crossover – Hyundai Tucson
 Best New Sport Compact – Volvo S40
 Best New Sports / Performance Car – Ford Mustang
 Best New Minivan – Honda Odyssey
 Best New Station Wagon – Mazda Mazda6 Sport Wagon
 Best New Pick-up – Toyota Tacoma
 Best New Convertible – Mercedes-Benz SLK350
 Best New Alternative Power – Honda Accord Hybrid

2004
 Best New Economy Car – Mazda Mazda3
 Best New Family Vehicle – Mazda Mazda6
 Best New Luxury Car – BMW 5-Series
 Best New Minivan – Toyota Sienna
 Best New MPV / Crossover Vehicle – Infiniti FX45
 Best New Pick-up Truck – Ford F-150
 Best New Sport Utility Vehicle – Subaru Forester 2.5 XT
 Best New Sports / Performance Vehicle – Mazda RX-8
 Best New Sports Coupe (over $35,000) – Infiniti G35 Coupe
 Best New Sports Coupe (under $35,000) – Mazda Mazda3 Sport

2003
 Best Economy Car – Mitsubishi Lancer ES
 Best New Design – Nissan 350Z
 Best New Family Vehicle – Honda Accord Sedan
 Best New Luxury Car – Mercedes-Benz E-Class
 Best New Sport Utility Vehicle (over $45,000) – Volvo XC90 2.5T
 Best New Sport Utility Vehicle (under $45,000) – Nissan Murano
 Best New Sports and Performance Car – Nissan 350Z
 Best New Sports Coupe (over $35,000) – Mercedes-Benz C32 AMG
 Best New Sports Coupe (under $35,000) – Mazdaspeed Protegé
 Best New Station Wagon – Pontiac Vibe
 Best New Technology – General Motors MagneRide System
 2003 Canadian Car of the Year – Nissan 350Z
 2003 Canadian Truck of the Year – Nissan Murano

2002
 Best New Design – Nissan Altima
 Best New Economy Car – Mazda Protegé
 Best New Family Car – Nissan Altima
 Best New Minivan – Honda Odyssey
 Best New Pick-up Truck – Chevrolet Avalanche
 Best New Prestige Car – BMW M3
 Best New Sport Utility Vehicle – Jeep Liberty
 Best New Sports Coupe – Acura RSX
 Best New Station Wagon – Mercedes-Benz C320 Wagon
 Best New Technology – General Motors Quadrasteer Four-Wheel Steering System
 2002 Canadian Car of the Year – Nissan Altima
 2002 Canadian Truck of the Year – Jeep Liberty

2001
 Best New Compact Sport Utility – Mazda Tribute
 Best New Design – Chrysler PT Cruiser
 Best New Economy Car – Honda Civic DX Sedan
 Best New Family Car (over $25,000) – Volvo S40
 Best New Family Car (under $25,000) – Chrysler PT Cruiser
 Best New Green Vehicle – Honda Insight
 Best New Intermediate Sport Utility Vehicle – Subaru Outback H6 3.0 VDC
 Best New Luxury Coupe or Sedan – Mercedes-Benz C240
 Best New Luxury Sport Utility Vehicle – Acura MDX
 Best New Minivan – Dodge Grand Caravan
 Best New Pick-up Truck – Dodge Dakota Quad Cab
 Best New Prestige Car – Audi A8 L
 Best New Sports and Performance Car – Chevrolet Corvette Z06
 Best New Sports Coupe (under $30,000) – Volkswagen GTI 1.8T
 Best New Sports Coupe or Sedan (over $30,000) – Volvo S60
 Best New Station Wagon – Volvo V40
 Best New Technology – Honda Insight Integrated Motor Assist System
 2001 Canadian Car of the Year – Chrysler PT Cruiser
 2001 Canadian Truck of the Year – Mazda Tribute

2000
 Best New Design – Audi TT Quattro Coupe
 Best New Economy Car – Ford Focus LX
 Best New Family Car (over $25,000) – Nissan Maxima GXE
 Best New Family Car (under $25,000) – Ford Focus ZTS
 Best New Luxury Car – Infiniti I30
 Best New Luxury Coupe – BMW 328Ci
 Best New Prestige Car – Audi A6 4.2
 Best New Sport Utility Vehicle – Nissan Xterra
 Best New Sports Car – Audi TT Quattro Coupe
 Best New Sports Coupe – Honda Civic SiR
 Best New Sports Coupe – Ford Focus ZX3
 Best New Sports Sedan – Nissan Maxima SE
 Best New Station Wagon – Saturn LW2
 Best New Technology – General Motors night vision
 2000 Canadian Car of the Year – Ford Focus
 2000 Canadian Truck of the Year – Nissan Xterra

1999
 Best New Design – Volkswagen New Beetle
 Best New Family Car (over $25,000) – Oldsmobile Intrigue 3.5
 Best New Family Car (under $25,000) – Mazda Protegé ES
 Best New Luxury Sedan – BMW 3-Series 328i
 Best New Performance Car – Chevrolet Corvette Hardtop
 Best New Pickup – GMC Sierra
 Best New Prestige Car – Volvo S80 T6
 Best New Sport Utility Vehicle – Jeep Grand Cherokee
 Best New Sports Coupe – Volkswagen New Beetle
 Best New Sports Sedan – Acura 3.2 TL
 Best New Station Wagon – Volkswagen Passat
 Best New Technology – Land Rover Active Cornering Enhancement (ACE)
 Best New Van – Honda Odyssey
 1999 Canadian Car of the Year – Acura TL 3.2
 1999 Canadian Truck of the Year – Honda Odyssey

1998
 Best New Design – Porsche Boxster
 Best New Family Sedan – Volkswagen Passat
 Best New Luxury Car – Mazda Millenia
 Best New Luxury Coupe – Mercedes-Benz CLK320
 Best New Luxury Sedan – Audi A6
 Best New Pickup – Mazda B-Series
 Best New Sport Utility Vehicle – Mercedes-Benz ML320
 Best New Sports Car – Porsche Boxster
 Best New Sports Coupe – Acura Integra Type R
 Best New Sports Sedan – Audi A4 1.8T
 Best New Station Wagon – Volvo V70
 Best New Van – Toyota Sienna
 1998 Car of the Year – Mercedes-Benz ML320

1997
 Best New Economy Car – Ford Escort Sedan
 Best New Family Car – Acura EL 1.6
 Best New Luxury Car – Cadillac Catera
 Best New Performance Car – BMW M3
 Best New Pickup – Ford F-150
 Best New Prestige Car – Mercedes-Benz E420
 Best New Sport Utility Vehicle – Ford Expedition
 Best New Sports Coupe/Convertible – Hyundai Tiburon
 Best New Station Wagon – Ford Escort Wagon
 Best New Van – Chevrolet Venture
 1997 Car of the Year – BMW M3

1996
 Best New Economy Car – Honda Civic
 Best New Family Car – Ford Taurus
 Best New Luxury Car – Infiniti I30
 Best New Pickup – Dodge Ram Extended Cab
 Best New Prestige Car – Mercedes-Benz E320
 Best New Sport Utility Vehicle – Chevrolet Tahoe
 Best New Sport Utility Vehicle – GMC Yukon
 Best New Sports Coupe – BMW 318ti
 Best New Station Wagon – Subaru Legacy Outback
 Best New Van – Dodge Caravan
 Best New Van – Plymouth Voyager
 1996 Car of the Year – Dodge Caravan
 1996 Car of the Year – Plymouth Voyager

1995
 Best New Convertible – Volkswagen Cabrio
 Best New Economy Car – Dodge Neon
 Best New Economy Car – Plymouth Neon
 Best New Family Car – Chrysler Cirrus
 Best New Performance Car – Mercedes-Benz E-Class E36
 Best New Prestige Car – BMW 740i
 Best New Sport Utility Vehicle – Chevrolet Blazer
 Best New Sport Utility Vehicle – GMC Jimmy
 Best New Sports Coupe – Honda del Sol VTEC
 Best New Wagon/Van – Subaru Legacy Station Wagon
 1995 Car of the Year – Dodge Neon
 1995 Car of the Year – Plymouth Neon

1994
 Best New Economy Car – Nissan Sentra
 Best New Family Sedan – Honda Accord
 Best New Luxury Car – Mercedes-Benz C-Class
 Best New Performance Car – Chevrolet Camaro Z28
 Best New Performance Car – Pontiac Trans Am
 Best New Performance Sedan – Volvo 850 Turbo
 Best New Pickup – Chevrolet S-10
 Best New Pickup – GMC Sonoma
 Best New Sports Car – Acura Integra Coupe
 Best New Station Wagon – Volvo 850 Turbo Wagon
 1994 Car of the Year – Mercedes-Benz C-Class

1993
 Best New Economy Car – Volkswagen Golf
 Best New Family Car – Chrysler LH platform
 Best New Light Truck/Sport Utility – Land Rover Range Rover County LWB
 Best New Luxury Car – Infiniti J30
 Best New Performance Car – Honda Prelude SRV
 Best New Sports Car – Volkswagen Corrado VR6
 Best New Wagon/Van – Subaru Legacy Touring Wagon LE
 1993 Car of the Year – Chrysler LH platform

1992
 Best New 4x4/Sport Utility/Light Truck – Suzuki
 Best New Economy Car – Honda Civic LX Sedan
 Best New Family Sedan – Nissan Maxima
 Best New Luxury Sedan – BMW 325i
 Best New Luxury Touring Coupe – Lexus SC 400
 Best New Performance Car – Mazda RX-7
 Best New Sporty Car – Mazda MX-3 Precidia
 Best New Van/Wagon – Dodge Colt
 Best New Van/Wagon – Plymouth Colt
 Best New Van/Wagon – Eagle Summit
 1992 Car of the Year – BMW 325i

1991
 Best New 4x4/Sport Utility/Light Truck – Ford Explorer
 Best New Coupe – Nissan NX
 Best New Luxury Sedan – Lexus LS 400
 Best New Sporty/Performance Car – Acura NSX
 Best New Van/Wagon – Toyota Previa
 1991 Car of the Year – Lexus LS 400

1990
 Best New Light Truck/Van/Sport Utility – Mazda MPV AWD
 Best New Performance/Sports Car – Nissan 300ZX
 Best New Sedan – Subaru Legacy
 Best New Sports Coupe – Eagle Talon
 Best New Sports Coupe – Plymouth Laser
 1990 Car of the Year – Nissan 300ZX

1989
 Best New Light Truck/Van/Sport Utility – Mazda MPV
 Best New Performance Car – Ford Taurus SHO
 1989 Car of the Year – Ford Taurus SHO

1988
 Best New Domestic Sedan – Lincoln Continental
 Best New Import Sedan – Acura Legend
 Best New Light Truck/Van /Utility – Chrysler Magicwagon
 Best New Sports Car – Toyota MR2 Supercharged
 Best New Sports Sedan/Coupe – Acura Legend Coupe
 1988 Car of the Year – Lincoln Continental

1987
 Best New Domestic Sedan – Pontiac Bonneville
 Best New Import Sedan – Toyota Camry
 Best New Light Truck/Van/Utility – Nissan Pathfinder
 Best New Sport Sedan/Coupe – Ford Thunderbird Turbo Coupe
 Best New Sports Car – Nissan Pulsar NX SE
 1987 Car of the Year – Pontiac Bonneville

1986
 Best New Domestic Sedan – Ford Taurus
 Best New Import Sedan – Honda Accord
 Best New Light Truck/Van/Sport Utility – Nissan Multi 4X4
 Best New Sports Car – Mazda RX-7
 Best New Sports Sedan – Saab 9000
 Best New Sports Sedan – Saab 900 Turbo 16

1985
 Best New Domestic Sedan – Volkswagen Golf
 Best New Import Sedan – Volkswagen Jetta
 Best New Light Truck/Van /Utility – Chrysler Magicwagon
 Best New Sports Car – Porsche

See also
 Car of the Year
 List of motor vehicle awards

External links
 https://web.archive.org/web/20100325140743/http://www.ajac.ca/web/ccoty/previous_byyear.asp

Motor vehicle awards